The women's 63 kg competition of the weightlifting events at the 2015 Pan American Games in Toronto, Canada, was held on July 13 at the Oshawa Sports Centre. The defending champion was Maria Escobar from Ecuador.

Each lifter performed in both the snatch and clean and jerk lifts, with the final score being the sum of the lifter's best result in each. The athlete received three attempts in each of the two lifts; the score for the lift was the heaviest weight successfully lifted.

Schedule
All times are Eastern Daylight Time (UTC-4).

Results
8 athletes from eight countries took part.

References

External links
Weightlifting schedule

Weightlifting at the 2015 Pan American Games
Pan
Wei